Estat Català (literally "Catalan State") is a pro-independence nationalist historical political party of Catalonia (Spain).

History

Estat Català is a historical pro-independence political party in Catalonia, Spain. It was founded by Francesc Macià in 1922, on its origins as a political nacional organisation and fighting of Catalan Nationalism whose purpose was to insurrect to the dictatorship of Primo de Rivera and bring about the independence of Catalonia from Spain in an international context. During the 1920s, the party was active in the fight against General Primo de Rivera's regime and the monarchy. Their actions included a failed assassination attempt against the King of Spain Alfonso XIII in an operation of its secret paramilitary unit named Santa Germandat Catalana de la Bandera Negra (Holy Catalan Brotherhood of the Black Flag) that was known as the Complot de Garraf (Conspiracy of Garraf). Estat Català also raised a small army named Exèrcit Català (Catalan Army) led by Francesc Macià to take control over the Principality from Prats-de-Mollo-la-Preste, in French Northern Catalonia.

When the government of Primo de Rivera banned separatist movements, the party became clandestine and Francesc Macià went into exile. Nonetheless, Estat Català was one of the parties promoting the "San Sebastian pact" with Basque nationalism, Galician nationalists and Spanish republicans they agreed to push for a democratic process in the Spanish monarchy.

During a conference held on the 17 and 19 of March 1931 at Cros street in the Sants district of Barcelona, Estat Català joined the Partit Republicà Català and the political group L'Opinió to form Esquerra Republicana de Catalunya. Nevertheless, inside Esquerra Republicana de Catalunya, the organizational autonomy of Estat Català was preserved and it controlled the influential youth section of the party (known as Joventuts d'Esquerra Republicana-Estat Català and, across Francesc Macià, his controlled the leadership of the new party.

In April 1931, Francesc Macià proclaimed the Catalan Republic in Barcelona, and established the Generalitat de Catalunya. Francesc Macià, with the support of a wide majority of the Catalan people, was the first president of the re-established Generalitat. After Francesc Macià's death (December, 1933) Estat Català tried to retain control of Esquerra Republicana de Catalunya, competing with the successor of Macià, the regionalist (rather than independentist) Lluís Companys (whose political background was in the Partit Republicà Català). The leadership of Estat Català fell to Josep Dencàs i Puigdollers and Estat Català took control of the Council of Interior and the policial forces of Catalonia. After the failure of the armed insurrection of October 1934, that pitted the autonomous government of Catalunya and its police with the Spanish government and the Spanish Army, Estat Català, after accusing Lluís Companys of perfidity, left Esquerra Republicana de Catalunya and once again became an independent party. The youth section of Esquerra Republicana de Catalunya, traditionally strongly paramilitary, also left the party and adhered to Estat Català. In 1936 the Spanish Civil War began.

In November 1936 Estat Català planned a violent coup, intended to topple the Companys-led Generalitat. The plan was to declare total independence of Catalonia as a state neutral in the Spanish Civil War, but security services mounted a pre-emptive strike; some EC leaders were detained and some fled to France. Under new leadership the Estat Català members then fought actively on the war fronts, creating its own corps of volunteers, the most important military units of Estat Català being the Pyrenaic mountain militias named Regiment Pirinenc de Catalunya, the Columna Macià-Companys and the expeditionary corp that fought in Majorca named Columna Volant Catalana (later 132 Brigada Mixta.

Estat Català were opposed to the revolutionary process in Catalonia during the war and to president Lluís Companys's delivery of power to anarchist syndicates. Relations between Estat Català and Esquerra Republicana de Catalunya became very bad. Estat Català planned a conspiracy to take control of the Autonomous government of Catalonia using its military units and the police of Catalonia for re-lead the situation using the force to be able to proclaim Catalonia's independence. The conspiracy to be discovered in September 1936 and the principal leaders of Estat Català were forced to flee to France.

From 1939, having lost the war, many of the combatants of the party were executed or died in exile. Also, some militants in exile in France were captured by the French government, handed to the German nazis and deported to the extermination camps of Mauthausen and Gusen. Those who stayed free joined the French Resistance and had worked intensely to help allied airmen and Jews to escape from occupied France and against the Francoist State up to his death.

Estat Català also gave Catalan nationalism a globalised vision of the Catalan nation: as early as in 1942, the party published the first map of the so-called "Catalan Countries" which included the Principality (with Northern Catalonia included), the Valencian Community, the Balearic Islands, the coterminous area of Catalonia with Aragón (known as La Franja or The Stripe) and the ancient Catalan town of Alghero in Sardinia.

In 1975, after the death of Franco, Spain started a process of democratisation. In 1976, after decades of secrecy, Estat Català claimed again its legalization under the direction of historical members of the party such as Josep Planchart i Martori, Ramon Rius, Xavier Balagueró i Ràfols, Jaume Ros i Serra, Martí Torrent i Blanchart, etc. Supporter of the independence movement of the Catalan Countries were declared, and interclass-conscious and they received the adhesion of historical militants of the years of the foundation of the party like Ventura Gassol i Rovira. By the time the Spanish general elections of 1977 were held Estat Català yet had not been legalized and had to form a coalition with other parties in the same situation (like Esquerra Republicana de Catalunya). Estat Català achieved legalization that same year and, on 16 September 1977 was finally registered in the Registry of Political Parties of the Ministerio del Interior. Later it spoke against the approval of the Spanish Constitution of 1978 and the regional political autonomy, since it considered them tools contrary to the full freedoms of the Catalans, like this like continuation of the Spanish State of the Caudillo Franco. According to the positioning of Estat Català, sustained already during the Spanish State on considering the possibility of a claim future of Statute, a Statute like that of 1979 remained subordinated to a Constitution on denying the inalienable national rights and imposing a Borbonic monarchy which was the heir of that of 1714 and of Francoist Spain.

Estat Català has contested Spanish general elections, but it did not initially stand in the Catalan regional elections, in order to not reduce the vote of the other nationalist parties. In the Spanish general elections of 1979 it obtained 6,328 votes, which was 0.29% of the total. At the municipal level Estat Català use the name Acció Municipal Democràtica has been presented repeatedly in the elections or in proper noun or lamb through its coalition.

Recent history 
Estat Català has contested several elections but has never attained a result better than 0.6% of the vote in Catalonia. At municipal level, through its municipal coalition Acció Municipal Democràtica it has achieved a variable number of town councilors depending on the electoral contest and also the government of some towns (45 town councilors 1979, 9 town councilors and two mayor's offices 2007, etc...)

Regarding the recent results Estat Català contested the elections to the Parliament of Catalonia in 1999, obtaining 1,174 votes (0.06%). In the Spanish general elections of 2000, it obtained 2,321 votes to the Congress of Deputies (0.07%) and 17,825 in the Senate (0.53%), to the elections in the Parliament of Catalonia (2003) it obtained 1,890 votes (0.06%) and to the Elections in the European Parliament of 2004 it obtained 1,540 votes (0.07%). From 2004 the party has not stood in elections except for local elections through its municipal coalition Acció Municipal Democràtica with which obtained, in 2007, 9 town councilors who allowed it to sustain the government of two town councils.

In recent years different groups have been fighting over who are the heirs of the historical party at a moment when support for independence is a cross-party policy widely supported and Estat Català have supported different options in different elections, Esquerra Republicana, Solidaritat Catalana per la Independència, etc.

References 

 Josep Carner i Ribalta. El Complot de Prats de Molló Barcelona. Dalmau editors, 1987.
 Joan Crexell i Playà. Origen de la bandera independentista. Barcelona: el Llamp, 1984.
 Imma Tubella i Casadevall. Jaume Compte i el Partit Català Proletari. Barcelona: la Magrana, 1979.
 Albert Viladot i Presas. Nacionalisme i premsa clandestina (1939–1951). Barcelona: Curial, 1987.

External links 
 Official website of Estat Català 

History of Catalonia
Political parties in Catalonia
Catalan independence movement
Pro-independence parties
Secessionist organizations in Europe
Political parties established in 1922
1922 establishments in Spain